is a JR West railway station located in Masuda, Shimane Prefecture, Japan. It is a junction of the Sanin Main Line and the Yamaguchi Line.

Adjacent stations

External links
Masuda Station (JR West) 

Railway stations in Japan opened in 1923
Railway stations in Shimane Prefecture
Sanin Main Line
Stations of West Japan Railway Company